Alfonso Muñoz (born 1932) is a Colombian sprinter. He competed in the men's 4 × 400 metres relay at the 1956 Summer Olympics.

References

1932 births
Living people
Athletes (track and field) at the 1956 Summer Olympics
Colombian male sprinters
Olympic athletes of Colombia
Place of birth missing (living people)